Nightmare Man is a 2006 horror film written and directed by Rolfe Kanefsky. It was produced by Paradigm Pictures, a division of Paradigm Entertainment Group, and Frederico Lapenda.

Plot

Ellen believes there is a supernatural creature trying to kill her named the "Nightmare Man". However, her husband and doctors believe she is a paranoid schizophrenic.

On the way to a psychiatric ward, the Morris' car breaks down. When her husband goes to get gas, Ellen stays behind and is attacked by the mysterious, horrifying enemy, the Nightmare Man. Escaping into the nearby woods, Ellen stumbles upon a country house where two young couples are spending the weekend. They do not know if the killer is real or just a figment of Ellen's tortured mind nor if the killer is outside or already inside the house.

As people start dying, nobody knows whom they can trust. Near the end of the film, the killer is revealed to be a hitman hired by Ellen's husband to kill Ellen before she discovers his affairs. Ellen reveals she is possessed by the real Nightmare Man, a demon who enters a female body first by getting them to wear his mask, then he rapes them. As the Nightmare Man, she kills the hitman and her husband. She sets her sights on Mia, the survivor, who kills Ellen, but is stripped and raped by the Nightmare Man's spirit. She is left in an institution, where the doctor decides to take her off her medication, which are the only things that keep the demon asleep.

Cast
 Blythe Metz as Ellen
 Tiffany Shepis as Mia
 Luciano Szafir as William
 Johanna Putnam as Trinity
 James Ferris as Jack
 Jack Sway as Ed
 Aaron Sherry as The Nightmare Man
 Richard Moll as Captain McCormack
 Gwen Davis as Officer Simmons
 Robert Donavan as Dr. Evans
 Victor Kanefsky as Officer Val
 Alice Glenn as Officer Kan

Release
The film was completed in 2006. That same year, it screened at film festivals, such as the Shriekfest horror film festival in Hollywood, and it played for one week in a regular engagement at a theatre in West Hollywood. However, it did not receive actual distribution until it was picked up to be part of the 2007 After Dark Horror Fest, which annually releases eight independent horror films nationwide.

References

External links

 

2006 films
American supernatural horror films
2006 horror films
2000s English-language films
2000s American films